Neo-Stalinism is the promotion of positive views of Joseph Stalin's role in history, the partial re-establishing of Stalin's policies on certain issues and nostalgia for the Stalin period. Neo-Stalinism overlaps significantly with neo-Sovietism and Soviet nostalgia. Various definitions of the term have been given over the years.

Definitions 

The American Trotskyist Hal Draper used "neo-Stalinism" in 1948 to refer to a new political ideology—new development in Soviet policy, which he defined as a reactionary trend whose beginning was associated with the Popular front period of the mid-1930s, writing: "The ideologists of neo-Stalinism are merely the tendrils shot ahead by the phenomena – fascism and Stalinism – which outline the social and political form of a neo-barbarism".

During the 1960s, the Central Intelligence Agency (CIA) distinguished between Stalinism and neo-Stalinism in that "[t]he Soviet leaders have not reverted to two extremes of Stalin's ruleone-man dictatorship and mass terror. For this reason, their policy deserves the label "neo-Stalinist" rather than "Stalinist".

Katerina Clark, describing an anti-Khrushchev, pro-Stalin current in Soviet literary world during the 1960s, described the work of "neo-Stalinist" writers as harking back to "the Stalin era and its leaders... as a time of unity, strong rule and national honor". According to historian Roy Medvedev, writing in 1975, the term describes the rehabilitation of Joseph Stalin, identification with him and the associated political system, nostalgia for the Stalinist period in Russia's history, restoration of Stalinist policies and a return to the administrative terror of the Stalinist period while avoiding some of the worst excesses. Academic Katerina Clark defines Neo-Stalinism as praising "the Stalin era and its leaders... as a time of unity, strong rule and national honor".

Political geographer Denis J. B. Shaw, writing in 1999, considered the Soviet Union as neo-Stalinist until the post-1985 period of transition to capitalism. He identified neo-Stalinism as a political system with planned economy and highly developed military–industrial complex.

Philosopher Frederick Copleston, writing in 2003, portrays neo-Stalinism as a "Slavophile emphasis on Russia and her history", saying that "what is called neo-Stalinism is not exclusively an expression of a desire to control, dominate, repress and dragoon; it is also the expression of a desire that Russia, while making use of western science and technology, should avoid contamination by western 'degenerate' attitudes and pursue her own path".

According to former General Secretary of the Communist Party of the Soviet Union Mikhail Gorbachev, using the term in 2006, it more broadly refers to a moderated Stalinist state without large-scale repressions, but with persecution of political opponents and total control of all political activities in the country.

Stalinism and anti-Stalinism 
In his monograph Reconsidering Stalinism, historian Henry Reichman discusses differing and evolving perspectives on the use of the term Stalinism, saying that "in scholarly usage 'Stalinism' describes here a movement, there an economic, political, or social system, elsewhere a type of political practice or belief-system". He references historian Stephen Cohen's work reassessing Soviet history after Stalin as a "continuing tension between anti-Stalinist reformism and neo-Stalinist conservatism", observing that such a characterization requires a "coherent" definition of Stalinismwhose essential features Cohen leaves undefined.

Alleged neo-Stalinist countries 
The regime of Romania under Nicolae Ceaușescu (1965–1989) has been classified by historians and political scientists as neo-Stalinist. Albanian leader Enver Hoxha described himself as neo-Stalinist as his ideology Hoxhaism also bears some Stalinist elements. After Stalin's death, Hoxha denounced Stalin's successor Nikita Khrushchev and accused him of revisionism which eventually caused Albania to withdraw itself from the Warsaw Pact. The Khalq regime in Afghanistan (April 1978 – December 1979) has been described as neo-Stalinist. Its policies shocked the country and contributed to starting the Soviet–Afghan War. North Korea has also been described by Western sources as a neo-Stalinist state, which adopted a modified Marxism–Leninism into Juche as the official ideology in the 1970s, with references to Marxism–Leninism altogether scrapped from the revised state constitution in 1992, following by references to communism in 2009.

Some socialist groups like the Trotskyist Alliance for Workers' Liberty describe modern China as "neo-Stalinist". By the end of the 20th and the beginning of the 21st century, Turkmenistan's Saparmurat Niyazov non-communist regime was sometimes considered a neo-Stalinist one, especially regarding his cult of personality. Islam Karimov's non-communist authoritarian regime in Uzbekistan from 1989 to 2016 has also been described as "neo-Stalinist".

Soviet Union 
In February 1956, Soviet leader Nikita Khrushchev denounced the cult of personality surrounding his predecessor Joseph Stalin and condemned crimes committed during the Great Purge. Khrushchev gave his four-hour speech, "On the Cult of Personality and Its Consequences", condemning the Stalin regime. Historian Robert V. Daniels holds that "neo-Stalinism prevailed politically for more than a quarter of a century after Stalin himself left the scene". Following the Trotskyist comprehension of Stalin's policies as a deviation from the path of Marxism–Leninism, George Novack described Khrushchev's politics as guided by a "neo-Stalinist line", its principle being that "the socialist forces can conquer all opposition even in the imperialist centers, not by the example of internal class power, but by the external power of Soviet example", explaining as such: "Khrushchev's innovations at the Twentieth Congress... made official doctrine of Stalin's revisionist practices [as] the new program discards the Leninist conception of imperialism and its corresponding revolutionary class struggle policies." American broadcasts into Europe during the late 1950s described a political struggle between the "old Stalinists" and "the neo-Stalinist Khrushchev".

In October 1964, Khrushchev was replaced by Leonid Brezhnev, who remained in office until his death in November 1982. During his reign, Stalin's controversies were de-emphasized. Andres Laiapea connects this with "the exile of many dissidents, especially Aleksandr Solzhenitsyn", though whereas Laiapea writes that "[t]he rehabilitation of Stalin went hand in hand with the establishment of a personality cult around Brezhnev". Political sociologist Viktor Zaslavsky characterizes Brezhnev's period as one of "neo-Stalinist compromise" as the essentials of the political atmosphere associated with Stalin were retained without a personality cult. According to Alexander Dubček, "[t]he advent of Brezhnev’s regime heralded the advent of neo-Stalinism, and the measures taken against Czechoslovakia in 1968 were the final consolidation of the neo-Stalinist forces in the Soviet Union, Poland, Hungary, and other countries". Brezhnev described the Chinese political line as "neo-Stalinist". American political scientist Seweryn Bialer has described Soviet policy as turning towards neo-Stalinism after Brezhnev's death.

After Mikhail Gorbachev took over in March 1985, he introduced the policy of glasnost in public discussions to liberalize the Soviet system. Within six years, the Soviet Union fell apart. Still, Gorbachev admitted in 2000 that "[e]ven now in Russia we have the same problem. It isn't so easy to give up the inheritance we received from Stalinism and Neo-Stalinism, when people were turned into cogs in the wheel, and those in power made all the decisions for them". Gorbachev's domestic policies have been described as neo-Stalinist by some Western sources.

Post-Soviet Russia 
In 2016, political scientist Thomas Sherlock posits that Russia has pulled back somewhat on its neo-Stalinist policies, commenting: "The Kremlin is unwilling to develop and impose on society historical narratives which promote chauvinism, hypernationalism, and re-Stalinization. Although such an agenda has some support among incumbent elites and in society, it remains subordinate.... Instead, the regime is now extending support to... a critical assessment of the Soviet era, including Stalinism. This emerging criticism of the Soviet past serves a number of important goals of the leadership, including re-engagement with the West. To this end, the Kremlin recently approved new history textbooks critical of the Soviet past as well as a significant program that memorializes the victims of Soviet repressions."

Public views 

As of 2008, more than half of Russians view Stalin positively and many support restoration of his monuments either dismantled by leaders or destroyed by rioting Russians during the 1991 dissolution of the Soviet Union. According to the Levada polling centre, Stalin's popularity marks have tripled among Russians in the last twenty years and the trend had accelerated since Vladimir Putin came to power.

In April 2019, a Levada center poll revealed that 70% of Russians approve of Stalin's role in Russian history, the highest ever recorded, and that 51% viewed Stalin in a positive light.

According to Andrew Osborn, statues of Stalin "have begun to reappear" and a museum in his honor has been opened in Volgograd (former Stalingrad). Steve Gutterman from the Associated Press quoted Vladimir Lavrov (deputy director of Moscow's Institute of Russian History) as saying that about ten Stalin statues have been restored or erected in Russia in recent years. In December 2013, Putin described Stalin as no worse than the "cunning" English 17th-century military dictator Oliver Cromwell.

School education 

In June 2007, Russian President Vladimir Putin organized a conference for history teachers to promote a high school teachers manual called A Modern History of Russia: 1945–2006: A Manual for History Teachers, which according to Irina Flige (office director of human rights organization Memorial) portrays Stalin as a cruel yet successful leader who "acted rationally". She claims it justifies Stalin's terror as an "instrument of development". Putin said at the conference that the new manual will "help instill young people with a sense of pride in Russia", and he posited that Stalin's purges pale in comparison to the United States' atomic bombings of Hiroshima and Nagasaki. At a memorial for Stalin's victims, Putin said that while Russians should "keep alive the memory of tragedies of the past, we should focus on all that is best in the country".

The official policy of the Russian Federation is that teachers and schools are free to choose history textbooks from the list of the admitted ones, which includes a total of forty-eight history text books for grade school and twenty-four history textbooks by various authors for high school.

In September 2009, the Education Ministry of Russia announced that Aleksandr Solzhenitsyn's The Gulag Archipelago, a book once banned in the Soviet Union for the detailed account on the system of prison camps, became required reading for Russian high-school students. Prior to that, Russian students studied Solzhenitsyn's short story Matryonin dvor and his novella One Day in the Life of Ivan Denisovich, an account of a single day in the life of a gulag prisoner.

History studies 
In 2009, it was reported that the Russian government was drawing up plans to criminalize statements and acts that deny the Soviet Union's victory over fascism in World War II or its role in liberating Eastern Europe. In May 2009, President Dmitry Medvedev described the Soviet Union during the war as "our country" and set up the Historical Truth Commission to act against what the Kremlin terms falsifications of Russian history.

On 3 July 2009, Russia's delegation at the Organization for Security and Co-operation in Europe's (OSCE) annual parliamentary meeting stormed out after a resolution was passed equating the roles of Nazi Germany and the Soviet Union in starting World War II, drafted by delegates from Lithuania and Slovenia. The resolution called for a day of remembrance for victims of both Stalinism and Nazism to be marked every 23 August, the date in 1939 when Nazi Germany and the Soviet Union signed the Molotov–Ribbentrop Pact of neutrality with a secret protocol that divided parts of Central and Eastern Europe between their spheres of influence.

Konstantin Kosachev, head of the foreign relations committee of Russia's lower house of parliament, called the resolution "nothing but an attempt to rewrite the history of World War II". Alexander Kozlovsky, the head of the Russian delegation, called the resolution an "insulting anti-Russian attack" and added that "[t]hose who place Nazism and Stalinism on the same level forget that it is the Stalin-era Soviet Union that made the biggest sacrifices and the biggest contribution to liberating Europe from fascism". Only eight out of 385 assembly members voted against the resolution.

Kurskaya station controversy 
At the end of August 2009 a gilded slogan, a fragment of the Soviet national anthem was re-inscribed at the Moscow Metro's Kursky station beneath eight socialist realist statues, reading: "Stalin reared us on loyalty to the people. He inspired us to labour and heroism". The slogan had been removed in the 1950s during Nikita Khrushchev's period of de-Stalinization. Another restored slogan reads: "For the Motherland! For Stalin!".

Restoring the slogans was ordered by the head of the metro Dmitry Gayev. He explained his decision with restoring the historic view of the station: "My attitude towards this story is simple: this inscription was at the station Kurskaya since its foundation, and it will stay there".

The chairman of a human rights group Memorial Arseny Roginsky stated: "This is the fruit of creeping re-Stalinization and... they [the authorities] want to use his name as a symbol of a powerful authoritarian state which the whole world is afraid of". Other human rights organizations and survivors of Stalin's repressions called for the decorations to be removed in a letter to Moscow Mayor Yury Luzhkov.

Mikhail Shvydkoy, the special representative of the President of Russia for the international cultural exchange, responded to the controversy: "In my opinion, the question whether such inscriptions should exist in the Moscow underground is not the question in the competence of neither the Mayor of Moscow, nor even the head of the Moscow underground. One can't take decisions that may break the society that's heated up and politicized even without that. It seems to me, that the presence of the lines about Stalin in the hall of the metro station Kurskaya is the question that should become the matter of discussion for the city denizens." Shvydkoy commented that what Stalin did in respect of the Soviet and in particular Russian people cannot be justified and he does not even deserve a neutral attitude, much less praise. However, he said "it's necessary to remember your own butchers" and without that memory they can "grow among us again". Shvydkoy said that the question is that the society must remember that "Stalin is a tyrant". While the inscription in the Metro should merely be read correctly, "read with the certain attitude to Stalin's personality". Shvydkoy also said that if the hall of the station Kurskaya is a monument of architecture and culture, the inscription must be left because "to knock down inscriptions is vandalism".

Opinions 
Scholar Dmitri Furman, director of the Commonwealth of Independent States Research Center at the Russian Academy's of Sciences Institute of Europe, sees the Russian regime's neo-Stalinism as a "non-ideological Stalinism" that "seeks control for the sake of control, not for the sake of world revolution".

In 2005, Communist politician Gennady Zyuganov said that Russia "should once again render honor to Stalin for his role in building socialism and saving human civilization from the Nazi plague". Zyuganov has said "Great Stalin does not need rehabilitation" and has proposed changing the name of Volgograd back to Stalingrad. In 2010, the Communist leader stated: "Today... the greatness of Stalin's era is self-evident even to his most furious haters... We liberated the whole world!".

In 2008, Dmitry Puchkov accused the authorities of raising a wave of anti-Stalin propaganda to distract the attention of the population from topical troubles. In a December 2008 interview, he was asked a question: "Dmitry Yurievich, what do you think, is the new wave of 'unveiling the horrors of Stalinism' on the TV related to the approaching consequences of the crisis or is it merely another [mental] exacerbation?". He replied: "The wave is being raised to distract opinion of the population from the up-to-date troubles. You don't have to think of your pension, you don't have to think of the education, what matters are the horrors of Stalinism".

Russian writer Sergey Kara-Murza believes that there is a trend to demonize Russia that is common not only in Poland, Ukraine and the Czech Republic, but in Russia as well. He contends that it is a good business and that it was a good business previously to demonize the Soviet Union: "Why do we need to take offense against Poles, if we in our country have the same (and for us – sufficiently more dangerous and hazardous) cohort of pundits, philosophers, historians who enjoy the maximal favourable regime set by the state and do the same things as Poles do?"

United States 
Sameera Khan, a former Miss New Jersey and reporter for RT, made a series of tweets glorifying Stalin and the gulag system and calling for his return. Khan was harshly criticized for expressing these views, including by RT itself, and the controversy led to her apologizing and leaving the network.

See also 
 Anti-Stalinist Left
 De-Stalinization
 Grover Furr
 Ludo Martens
 Neo-Sovietism
 Nostalgia for the Soviet Union
 "On the Cult of Personality and Its Consequences"
 Soviet patriotism
 Stalin Society
 The Stalinist Legacy
 Tankie, a pejorative term for pro-Soviet communists

References

Further reading 
 Khapaeva, Dina. "Triumphant memory of the perpetrators: Putin's politics of re-Stalinization." Communist & Post-Communist Studies (March 2016), pp 61–73. celebrations of Stalin's memory in Russia today. online
 Khapaeva, Dina. "Historical memory in post-Soviet Gothic society." Social Research (2009): 359–394. online
 Sherlock, Thomas. "Russian politics and the Soviet past: Reassessing Stalin and Stalinism under Vladimir Putin." Communist and Post-Communist Studies 49.1 (2016): 45–59. online
 Torbakov, Igor. "History, Memory and National Identity: Understanding the politics of history and memory wars in post-Soviet lands." Demokratizatsiya 19.3 (2011): 209+ online 
 Tumarkin, Maria M. "The Long Life of Stalinism: Reflections on the Aftermath of Totalitarianism and Social Memory." Journal of social history 44.4 (2011): 1047–1061.

External links 
 Agence France-Presse, 2015. Stalin portraits emerge in heart of Ukraine's rebel-held territory. 19 October The Guardian.
 Russian history in the classroom 
 Stalin's Return Time Magazine, 1970
 Moscow: Stalin 2.0 – video report by Global Post
 The rehabilitation of Stalin  – an ideological cornerstone of the new Kremlin politics World Socialist Web Site, 2000
 Russian historians denounce re-Stalinization Eurasia Daily Monitor, 2005
 Russia: Nostalgia For USSR Increases By Victor Yasmann, RFE/RL, 21 December 2006
 Outrage at revision of Stalin's legacy , by Andrew Osborn, 21 February 2006
 Russia: Gorbachev Speaks About Democracy, Authoritarianism, RFE/RL, 1 March 2006

 
Anti-revisionism
Eponymous political ideologies
Historical negationism